The 1982–83 NCAA Division III men's ice hockey season began in November 1982 and concluded on March of the following year. This was the 10th season of Division III college ice hockey.

Regular season

Standings

See also
 1982–83 NCAA Division I men's ice hockey season
 1982–83 NCAA Division II men's ice hockey season

References

 
NCAA